The Khuriya Muriya Islands (also Kuria Muria, Kooria Mooria, Curia Muria) (transliterated: Juzur Khurīyā Murīyā or Khūryān Mūryān) are a group of five islands in the Arabian Sea,  off the southeastern coast of Oman. The islands form part of the province of Shalim and the Hallaniyat Islands in the governorate of Dhofar.

History
In antiquity the islands were called the Zenobii or Zenobiou Islands or Doliche. The islands were mentioned by several early writers including Ptolemy (vi. 7. § 47) who numbered them as seven small islands lying in Khuriya Muriya Bay, towards the entrance of the "Persian Gulf" (most likely the modern Gulf of Aden). The Periplus of the Erythraean Sea, a periplus dated to between AD 40 and 70, mentioned the Khuriya Muriya Islands, then called Isles of Zenobios:

In 1854 the sultan of Muscat (later Muscat and Oman, now Oman) presented the islands to Queen Victoria as a gift and responsibility for the islands was granted to the Bombay government in British India. There was some concern at the time that the deed of cession was null since the sultan had no rights over the archipelago. The Red Sea and India Telegraph Company, formed in 1858, intended to use one of the islands as a base for a telegraph connection between Aden and Karachi but the project was abandoned in 1861 after sections of the cable failed. A group of Liverpool entrepreneurs were granted monopoly rights to harvest the abundant guano deposits, but after having met resistance from the local inhabitants who considered that resource theirs, and questions in the British parliament about the advisability of granting monopoly rights to anyone, the mining was abandoned after some 200,000 tons had been extracted between 1855 and 1860. During that period, the archipelago presented a busy scene, with up to 52 ships present on one occasion. AS per a British intelligence report from 1883, less than 40 inhabitants lived on Al-Hallaniyah, the main island. The islanders lived in huts of unmortared stone with mat roofs, and at certain seasons they moved to caves. They lived on fish, shellfish and goat's milk, occasionally exchanging dried fish for dates and rice from passing ships. They fished entirely with hooks since they had neither boat nor nets.

In 1886, the islands were attached administratively to Aden. Due to their remoteness, the lack of anchorages and the fact that the inhabitants continued to consider themselves subjects of the Sultan of Muscat, the islands remained un-administered and, for decades, were only sporadically visited by British officials. While technically part of Aden Colony, the islands, because of their remoteness and inaccessibly, were left to the supervision of the British Resident in the Persian Gulf.  As a British possession until 1967, they were administered by the  Governor of Aden until 1953, then by the British High Commissioner until 1963, and finally by the British Chief Political Resident of the Persian Gulf (based in Bahrain). On 30 November 1967, Lord Caradon, the British Ambassador to the United Nations, announced that in accordance with the wishes of the local inhabitants, the islands would be returned to Muscat and Oman, despite criticism from President Qahtan Muhammad al-Shaabi that the islands should be transferred to the People's Republic of South Yemen.  The boundary between the two countries was not formally settled until 1992 when it was agreed that the islands were on Oman's side of the line.

Important Bird Area
The island group has been designated an Important Bird Area (IBA) by BirdLife International because it supports seabird breeding colonies of red-billed tropicbirds, tropical shearwaters, masked boobies, Socotra cormorants, sooty gulls, and bridled and greater crested terns. Other significant birds are resident mourning wheatears and visiting Jouanin's petrels.

Islands

See also
Al-Hallaniyah
Oman–Yemen relations

References

Further reading

 Tim Mackintosh-Smith: Travels with a Tangerine: A Journey in the Footnotes of Ibn Battutah.

 .

External links

WorldStatesmen - Oman
Hazlitt, Classical Gazetteer, "Zenobii ins."
Hazlitt, Classical Gazetteer, "Doliche"
Nautical Information (Sailing Directions)

Islands of Oman
Disputed islands
Territorial disputes of Yemen
Territorial disputes of Oman
Oman–Yemen relations
Seabird colonies
Important Bird Areas of Oman
Important Bird Areas of Indian Ocean islands